"We Keep on Rockin" is a Eurodance song written by Anders Hansson and performed by Swedish band Alcazar. The song is the first single from their third album, Disco Defenders and it was released in the beginning of 2008.

Music video
A music video was produced to promote the single.

Formats and track listings
These are the formats and track listings of promotional single releases of "We Keep on Rockin'".

CD single
"Radio Edit" - 3:36
"Extended Mix" - 6:36
"FL Club Mix" - 3:50
"FL On the Rocks Version" - 3:09
"Belotto & Cabrera Club Mix" - 4:28

Chart performance
The song made its debut on Swedish Singles Charts at number 31 on 7 February 2008 and it peaked at number 4 on 21 February 2008, giving Alcazar one more Top 10 hit chart. "We Keep on Rockin'" stayed on the Swedish Singles Charts for a total of eleven weeks.

References

External links
Alcazar Official Website

Songs about rock music
Alcazar (band) songs
2008 singles
2008 songs
Songs written by Anders Hansson (songwriter)
Universal Records singles